Pierre Caron may refer to:
Pierre Caron (director) (1900–1971), French film director
Pierre Caron (historian) (1875–1952), French historian and archivist
Pierre Caron (politician) (born 1936), Liberal party member of the Canadian House of Commons